Sipperly-Lown Farmhouse is a historic home located at Rhinebeck, Dutchess County, New York. The farmhouse was built about 1868 and is a one and one half to two story frame cruciform plan building in a picturesque, Gothic style. It features a variety of late Victorian era, eclectic wood ornamentation. Also on the property are a contributing barn, Dutch barn built about 1800, machine shed, and a corn crib.

It was added to the National Register of Historic Places in 1987.

See also

National Register of Historic Places listings in Rhinebeck, New York

References

Houses on the National Register of Historic Places in New York (state)
Houses completed in 1868
Houses in Rhinebeck, New York
National Register of Historic Places in Dutchess County, New York